Berezhnoye is a rural locality (a selo) and the administrative center of Troitskoye Rural Settlement, Ust-Kubinsky District, Vologda Oblast, Russia. The population was 665 as of 2002. There are 16 streets.

Geography 
Berezhnoye is located 43 km northwest of Ustye (the district's administrative centre) by road. Kurkinskaya is the nearest rural locality.

References 

Rural localities in Ust-Kubinsky District